Nuwan Liyanapathirana (born 22 May 1987) is a Sri Lankan cricketer. He made his first-class debut for Sri Lanka Army Sports Club in the 2008–09 Premier Trophy on 16 January 2009.

References

External links
 

1987 births
Living people
Sri Lankan cricketers
Sri Lanka Army Sports Club cricketers
People from Central Province, Sri Lanka